The 39th Arizona State Legislature, consisting of the Arizona State Senate and the Arizona House of Representatives, was constituted in Phoenix from January 1, 1989, to December 31, 1990, during the last two years of  Rose Mofford's term as governor. Both the Senate and the House membership remained constant at 30 and 60, respectively. The Democrats gained two seats in the Senate, cutting the Republican majority to 17–13, and the Democrats also gained a seat in the house, decreasing the Republican majority to 35–25.

Sessions
The Legislature met for two regular sessions at the State Capitol in Phoenix. The first opened on January 9, 1989, and adjourned on June 16, while the Second Regular Session convened on January 8, 1990, and adjourned sine die on June 28.

There were five Special Sessions, the first of which was convened on September 20, 1989, and adjourned on September 22; the second convened on November 21, 1989, and adjourned sine die on November 22; the third convened on January 10, 1990, and adjourned sine die on June 28; the fourth convened on May 14, 1990, and adjourned sine die on May 16; and the fifth convened on November 19, 1990, and adjourned sine die later on that same day.

State Senate

Members

The asterisk (*) denotes members of the previous Legislature who continued in office as members of this Legislature.

House of Representatives

Members 
The asterisk (*) denotes members of the previous Legislature who continued in office as members of this Legislature.

References

Arizona legislative sessions
1989 in Arizona
1990 in Arizona
1989 U.S. legislative sessions
1990 U.S. legislative sessions